Keith Hart may refer to:

 Keith Hart (anthropologist) (born 1943), anthropology professor at Goldsmiths College, University of London
 Keith Hart (wrestler) (born 1951), Canadian retired firefighter and professional wrestler